Mirovyane Peak is the peak rising to 1387 m in Maglenik Heights, north-central Sentinel Range in Ellsworth Mountains, Antarctica.  It is surmounting Kopsis Glacier to the west, lower Embree Glacier to the north, and Young Glacier to the south.

The peak is named after the settlement of Mirovyane in Western Bulgaria.

Location
US mapping in 1961, updated in 1988.

See also
 Mountains in Antarctica

Maps
 Vinson Massif.  Scale 1:250 000 topographic map.  Reston, Virginia: US Geological Survey, 1988.
 Antarctic Digital Database (ADD). Scale 1:250000 topographic map of Antarctica. Scientific Committee on Antarctic Research (SCAR). Since 1993, regularly updated.

Notes

External links
 Mirovyane Peak SCAR Composite Antarctic Gazetteer
 Bulgarian Antarctic Gazetteer Antarctic Place-names Commission (in Bulgarian)
 Basic data (in English)

External links
 Mirovyane Peak. Copernix satellite image

Ellsworth Mountains
Mountains of Ellsworth Land
Bulgaria and the Antarctic